"Lay All Your Love on Me" is a song recorded by Swedish pop group ABBA in 1980 for their seventh studio album, Super Trouper. The song was released as the sixth and final single from the album in the summer of 1981. At the time, it was the highest selling 12-inch record in UK chart history, where it peaked at No. 7. 

In 2006, Slant Magazine placed it at No. 60 on their list of the greatest dance songs of all time, and at 66 on the updated 2020 list.

History
"Lay All Your Love on Me" is an electro-disco song penned by Benny Andersson and Björn Ulvaeus, with Agnetha Fältskog singing lead. Recording began at Polar Music Studios in Stockholm on 9 September 1980, with the final mix of the song being completed on 10 October 1980.

"Lay All Your Love on Me" is known for a descending vocal sound at the end of the verse immediately preceding the refrain. This was achieved by sending the vocal into a harmoniser device, which was set up to produce a slightly lower-pitched version of the vocal. In turn its output was fed back to its input, thereby continually lowering the pitch of the vocal. Andersson and Ulvaeus felt that the chorus of the song sounded like a hymn, so parts of the vocals in the choruses were run through a vocoder, to recreate the sound of a church congregation singing, slightly out of tune. The song was not originally intended to be released as a single, but was issued in 12-inch form in the UK and a few other countries in 1981. "Lay All Your Love on Me" has since been much covered and is also featured in the Mamma Mia! musical (and its film adaptation), that showcases many of ABBA's hits.

Music video
ABBA did not film a promotional video for "Lay All Your Love on Me", and so Epic hastily assembled a video (at a cost of £3,500) by using excerpts from the existing ABBA videos for "Take a Chance on Me", "Summer Night City", "The Name of the Game", "I Have a Dream", "Voulez-Vous" and "The Winner Takes It All". It was never shown on TV because Epic managers thought it "wasn't needed", but was included on the ABBA Gold VHS.

Reception
As "Lay All Your Love on Me" was not intended to be a single, it was not released until 1981, the year after it had been recorded. It was only after a remixed version by Raul A. Rodriguez - (aka C.O.D) of Disconet - had soared in popularity in nightclubs, that it topped the U.S. Hot Dance Club Play chart (along with "Super Trouper" and "On and on and On"). Therefore, the decision was made to release "Lay All Your Love on Me" in limited territories in 12-inch form, as opposed to the standard 7-inch record. It peaked at No. 7 in the UK, becoming ABBA's lowest charting single since "I Do, I Do, I Do, I Do, I Do" in 1975. However, reaching No. 7 in the charts was, at the time, the highest charting position achieved for a 12-inch only release in the UK. "Lay All Your Love on Me" also charted in Ireland (No. 8), Belgium (No. 13) and West Germany (No. 26).

As of September 2021, it is ABBA's 17th-biggest song in the UK, including both pure sales and digital streams.

Personnel

Agnetha Fältskog – lead vocals 
Anni-Frid Lyngstad – backing vocals 
Benny Andersson – keyboards, synthesizers, backing vocals
Björn Ulvaeus - guitar, backing vocals
Lasse Wellander - guitar 
Rutger Gunnarsson – bass 
Ola Brunkert – drums

Chart performance

Certifications

Original version

Mamma Mia! version

Cover versions

Information Society version

"Lay All Your Love on Me" was covered by American techno-pop band Information Society on their 1988 self-titled debut album. The track peaked at No. 83 on the Billboard Hot 100 in 1989. It was later included on the compilation ABBA: A Tribute – The 25th Anniversary Celebration.

Track listing
 "Lay All Your Love on Me" (Justin Strauss Remix)
 "Lay All Your Love on Me" (Restricted Re-mix)
 "Lay All Your Love on Me" (Prohibited Dub)
 "Lay All Your Love on Me" (Radio Hot Mix)
 "Lay All Your Love on Me" (Phil Harding Metal Mega-Mix) 
 "Funky at 45"

Helloween version

"Lay All Your Love on Me" was covered by Helloween from their Metal Jukebox album. It was released as a single in Japan.

 Single track listing

 Credits
Andi Deris – vocals
Roland Grapow – lead and rhythm guitars
Michael Weikath – lead and rhythm guitars
Markus Grosskopf – bass guitar
Uli Kusch – drums

References

1980 songs
1981 singles
1989 singles
1999 singles
ABBA songs
Information Society (band) songs
Polar Music singles
Songs written by Benny Andersson and Björn Ulvaeus
Tommy Boy Records singles